Arthur Sidney Olliff (21 October 1865 – 29 December 1895), was an Australian taxonomist who was active as Government entomologist in New South Wales. He came to Australia in December 1844 to work at the Australian Museum.

Discoveries
Rhinotia acrobeles (1889)

Publications
A chapter on collecting and preserving insects - Arthur Sidney Olliff (1889)
Australian butterflies : a brief account of the native families : with a chapter on collecting & preserving insects - Arthur Sidney Olliff (1889) 
The Mesozoic and Tertiary Insects of New South Wales - Robert Etheridge, Junior, Arthur Sidney Olliff (1890) 
Insect pests. The maize moth (Heliothris armigera, Hub.) - Arthur Sidney Olliff (1890)
Insect pests. The codling moth (Carpocapsa pomonella, Linn.) - Arthur Sidney Olliff (1890)
Insect friends and foes : [lady-birds, or, Coccinellidae - Arthur Sidney Olliff (1891)
The codling moth, Carpocapsa pomonella, Linn. : its life-history and habits - Arthur Sidney Olliff (1892)
Australian Entomophytes Or Entomogenous Fungi, and Some Account of Their Insect Hosts - Arthur Sidney Olliff (1895)

References

Australian entomologists
Australian taxonomists
1865 births
1895 deaths
19th-century Australian zoologists